Wilshire may refer to:

People
Wilshire (surname)

Places
Beaumont-Wilshire, Portland, Oregon, a neighborhood in that city
Stonybrook-Wilshire, Pennsylvania, a community in that state
Mid-Wilshire, a neighborhood in Central Los Angeles
Wilshire Boulevard, a street in Los Angeles County
Wilshire Park, Los Angeles, a district in that city

Buildings and commercial centers
Bullocks Wilshire, a notable building in Los Angeles, California
The Regent Beverly Wilshire Hotel, in Beverly Hills, California
Wilshire Center, Los Angeles, California
Wilshire Theater, Beverly Hills, California
Wilshire Grand Center, skyscraper in Los Angeles, California

Heavy-rail stations
Wilshire/Normandie, Los Angeles County Metro Rail station
Wilshire/Vermont, Los Angeles County Metro Rail station
Wilshire/Western, Los Angeles County Metro Rail station

Miscellaneous
LAPD Wilshire Division, a division of the Los Angeles Police Department
Wilshire 4500, stock index
Wilshire 5000, stock index
Wilshire Associates, a global investment firm
Epiphone Wilshire, an electric guitar originally manufactured by Epiphone in the 1960s

See also
 Wilshere, a surname
Willshire (disambiguation)
Wiltshire (disambiguation)